The Prva Hrvatska Malonogometna Liga (Croatian First Futsal League) is the top futsal league in Croatia.

Ten teams currently comprise the league. The Croatian First League winner is entered into the UEFA Futsal Champions League. Clubs also compete in the Croatian Futsal Cup.

The league was formed in 1991 with the dissolution of the Yugoslav leagues. It is operated by the Croatian Football Federation.

Champions

Teams 2022–23

External links
 Croatian Prva HMNL at the Croatian Football Federation
 www.crofutsal.com

Futsal competitions in Croatia
Croatia
futsal
1992 establishments in Croatia
Sports leagues established in 1992